This is the discography of American DJ Bassnectar.

Studio albums

Extended plays

Singles

As lead artist

As featured artist

Mixtapes

Remixes

Videos 
 "Bomb tha Blocks" (2007)
 "Vava Voom" feat. Lupe Fiasco (2012)
 "Ugly" feat. Amp Live (2012)
 "Midnight"Joker (Bassnectar Remix) (2015)
 "Reaching Out" (2016)
 "TKO" feat. Rye Rye & Zion I (2016)
 "Underground" with G Jones (2017)
 "Horizons" with Dorfex Bos (2017)
 "I'm Up" with Gnar Gnar feat. Born I Music (2017)
 "Infrared" feat. Macntaj (2017)
 "Arps Of Revolución" (2017)
 "Journey To The Center" (2017)
 "Slather" with Digital Ethos (2017)
 "Other Worlds" with Dorfex Bos (2017)
 "Psyopia" Naux Faux (Bassnectar Remix) (2017)
 "Disrupt The System" with Peekaboo feat. Azeem (2017)
 "Illusion" with Peekaboo feat. Born I Music (2019)
 "It's About To Get Hectic" with Jantsen feat. Born I Music (2019)
 "Dive" feat. RD (2019)
 "Irresistable Force" with Hailo (2019)
 "Open Your Mind" with Yookie! (2020)
 "Deep In The Jungle" with UFO! (2020)

References 

Discographies of American artists
Electronic music discographies